1, 2, to the Bass is bassist and composer Stanley Clarke's 26th solo album. It was released by Sony Music Entertainment Inc. on April 13, 2003. The track "Where Is the Love" was nominated for the 2004 Grammy Award for Best R&B Performance By A Duo Or Group With Vocals. 1, 2, to the Bass has been praised for both showcasing Stanley Clarke's ability on the bass, and for its variety of guest artists.

Track listing

Personnel 
 Stanley Clarke – bass guitar, double bass, tenor bass, piano, vocals
 Michael Hunter – trumpet
 Reggie Young – trombone
 Everette Harp – saxophone
 Doug Webb – saxophone
 Hubert Laws – flute
 Myron McKinley – keyboards
 George Duke – keyboards
 Bob Leatherbarrow – vibraphone
 L. Subramaniam – violin
 Paul Jackson Jr. – guitar
 Joe Satriani – guitar
 Michael Thompson – guitar
 Jimmy Earl – bass
 Armand Sabal-Lecco – bass
 Reggie Hamilton – bass
 Gerry Brown – drums
 Vinnie Colaiuta – drums
 John "J.R." Robinson – drums
 Amel Larrieux – vocals
 Glenn Lewis – vocals
 Oprah Winfrey – spoken word
 Q-Tip – spoken word, co-producer (track #1)
 Quincy Jones  – co-producer (track #11)
 Dre & Vidal – co-producer (track #3)

References 

2003 albums
Stanley Clarke albums
Sony Music albums
Albums produced by Stanley Clarke
Albums produced by Dre & Vidal
Albums produced by Q-Tip (musician)
Albums produced by Quincy Jones